The Bus lines in Tirana refer to the bus lines operated by both private and public companies in Tirana, Albania. Despite the introduction of relatively new buses, passengers experience overcrowding and intermittent use of air conditioning on board.

Lines
The Following lines run through Tirana. Some start at the city center near Skanderbeg Square (hence the name "Qender", meaning "Centre") or near the Clock Tower of Tirana. 
Kombinat-Kinostudio
Uzina Dinamo-Sharrë
Porcelan
Sauk
Lapraka
Uzina e Traktorëve
Institut
Tirana e Re
Unaza

Kristal
Tirana Zoo
Kamëz
Vorë
Bërzhitë
Sharrë
Kashar
Babrrujë
Ndroq
Linzë
Mjull-Bathore
Mihal Grameno (planned)
Allias-Liqen (planned)

City buses cost 40 Lek, this includes the tax of the Ministry of Finance. The Vorë bus is 50 Lek.

In addition, there are several bus lines linking Tirana to several shopping centers in the suburbs:
Citypark
QTU
Casa Italia
Tirana East Gate

Further, there exists a line serving Tirana International Airport from and to Skanderbeg Square:
 Rinas Express

Intercity and International Buses and Minibuses
In anticipation of the construction of the two new multi-modal bus terminals near Kamza Overpass on the western entrance of Tirana, and near TEG Shopping Center in southeastern Tirana, inter-city lines depart from different locations around Tirana as follows:
 Northern and Southern Albania including Durres lines: Kamza Overpass (Kthesa e Kamzes) on the grounds of the future Tirana Multimodal Bus Terminal
 Southeastern Albania lines: Rruga Arben Broci, Student City (Qyteti Studenti)
 Kosovo and International lines: Rruga Ali Kolonja behind Asllan Rusi Sports Palace near Karl Topia Square (Zogu Zi)

References

External links
Tirana Parking Official Site
Tirana Public Transport Useful web application with real time GPS info on Tirana bus arrival and departure times
Schemes of Tirana urban buses
TTP Transport Tirana Bus- Photos of current buses in Tirana

 National Association of Urban Transport of Albania - Tirana City Lines Timetables and Maps (Albanian)

Transport in Tirana
Road transport in Albania